Sakay is a 1993 Filipino historical drama film directed by Raymond Red. The film stars Julio Diaz, Tetchie Agbayani, and Leopoldo Salcedo. It was produced by Alpha Omega Productions. The film portrays the latter part of the life of Filipino patriot and hero Macario Sakay, who was declared an outlaw and a criminal for continuing hostilities against the United States after the "official" end of the Philippine–American War.  It was also the last movie appearance of Leopoldo Salcedo in 1993 5 years before his sudden death in 1998.

Plot
Sakay was a carriage factory worker and stage actor from Tondo, Manila who joined Andres Bonifacio's revolutionary secret society, the Katipunan. He fought during the Philippine Revolution against Spain and later in the Philippine–American War. Sakay remained in the field even after the capture of President Emilio Aguinaldo and the fall of the First Philippine Republic. He was captured, but was released during an amnesty.

Sakay then took to the mountains to revive the Katipunan, together with Francisco Carreon, Julian Montalan, Cornelio Felizardo and other rebel leaders. He proclaimed himself General and President of the "Tagalog Republic" (Republika ng Katagalugan), and engaged the United States Army and the Philippine Constabulary in guerrilla warfare. On occasion, he was aided by talisman-wearing cultist warriors.

After years of fighting, Sakay was convinced to surrender by Filipino labor leader Dr. Dominador Gomez, who argued that the establishment of a Philippine National Assembly, instead of armed resistance, presented the soundest option towards attaining Filipino independence.

On the understanding that the American government offered amnesty, Sakay and his officers came down from the mountains. However, as a ruse, they were invited to a reception in Cavite and arrested by the Americans. Tried and convicted for brigandage, Sakay and Colonel Lucio de Vega were hanged while Montalan and others received life imprisonment.

Cast
Julio Diaz as Gen. Macario Sakay
Tetchie Agbayani as Elena
Leopoldo Salcedo as Sakay's father
Nanding Josef as Dr. Dominador Gomez
Karlo Altomonte as Francisco Carreon
Pen Medina as Col. Lucio de Vega
Ray Ventura as Gen. Cornelio Felizardo
Raymond Keannu as Gen. Julian Montalan
Mike Lloren as Gen. Emilio Aguinaldo
John Arcilla as Gen. Leon Villafuerte
Bon Vibar as Capt. Harry Hill Bandholtz
Arvin Pestaño as Antonio Montenegro

Accolades

References

External links

1993 films
Biographical films about military leaders
Cultural depictions of Emilio Aguinaldo
Films set during the Philippine–American War
Films set in the 1890s
Films set in the 1900s
Philippine biographical drama films
1990s biographical drama films